Alcazarén is a town and municipality in the Province of Valladolid, part of the autonomous community of Castile and León, Spain. with a population of 702 (as of January 1, 2004 census). Its name originates from the Arab "al-qasrayn" which means "the two castles". In the Tierra de Pinares region it is located 35 km South of the province's capital (41.3725° N, 4.6714° W). It occupies an area of 48 km² with a 33.51 km perimeter.

See also
List of municipalities in Valladolid

References

External links
ALCAZARÉN. Description, history and pictures

Municipalities in the Province of Valladolid